Nicole Bacharan (born 25 January 1955) is a French historian and political scientist specializing in American society and French-American relations. She is a researcher with the National Foundation for Political Science (Sciences Po) and was a National Fellow at the Hoover Institution at Stanford University in California from 2013 to 2014.

Famous for her books and her TV appearances and radio broadcasts in France and the United States, she is the author of numerous essays including several bestsellers, "Faut-il avoir peur de l’Amérique ?" (Should We Be Afraid of America?) and "Américains-Arabes, l’affrontement" (Americans-Arabs, The Confrontation). In collaboration with Dominique Simonnet, she also writes novels in the Némo series.

On September 11, 2001, live from the France 2 evening news show hosted by David Pujadas, she left a mark on French television-watchers when she said "Tonight, we are all Americans," a phrase repeated the following day in the newspaper Le Monde.

TV appearances and radio broadcasts 

In France, Nicole Bacharan, nicknamed by The New Economist "Miss America", is a radio contributor for Europe 1 on international politics, questions concerning the United States, and transatlantic relations. She is also a contributor to numerous television programs in France and Europe (TF1, France 2, France 3, TV5, I Television).

In the United States, she has given many interviews on these same topics to The New York Times, The Washington Post or NPR, and  appears on CNN, ABC and other networks.

Speaker 

Nicole Bacharan gives frequent conferences for numerous organizations, including "L'Alliance française", the French American Foundation, "l'Association France-Amérique", "l'Association France-Etats Unis".

From 1997 to 2002, she taught a seminar in English at the Institut d’Etudes Politiques de Paris on contemporary America (The New American Dream). She is also a member of the scientific committee of the Blois Historical Association and the History-Science Commission on Man and Society at the National Book Center.

Books 

 11 septembre, le jour du chaos, avec Dominique Simonnet, Ed. Perrin, 2011
 La Plus Belle Histoire des femmes, avec Françoise Héritier, Michelle Perrot, Sylviane Agasinski, Seuil, 2011
 Les Noirs américains, des champs de coton à la Maison blanche , Éd. Perrin, 2010
 La Plus Belle Histoire de la liberté, avec André Glucksmann et Abdelwahab Meddeb, postface by Václav Havel, Seuil, 2009
 Le Petit livre des élections américaines, Éd. du Panama, 2008
 Les Noirs américains , Éd. du Panama, 2008
 Pourquoi nous avons besoin des Américains, Seuil, mars 2007
 Américains, Arabes : l’affrontement (avec Antoine Sfeir), Seuil, septembre 2006
 Faut-il avoir peur de l’Amérique ? Seuil, octobre 2005
 Good Morning America, Seuil, 2001
 L’amour expliqué à nos enfants, avec Dominique Simonnet, Seuil, 2000
 Le Piège : quand la démocratie perd la tête, Seuil, 1998
 Histoire des Noirs américains au XXème siècle, Complexe, 1994

Novels, with Dominique Simonnet :

 Némo dans les Étoiles, Seuil, 2004
 Némo en Égypte, Seuil, 2002
 Némo en Amérique, Seuil, 2001
 Le Livre de Némo, Seuil, 1998

Order 

The President of French Republic awarded her with the Legion of Honor in 2007.

References

External links
 Nicole Bacharan and Dominique Simonnet
 Nicole Bacharan

1955 births
Living people
French television journalists
20th-century French writers
21st-century French writers
Sciences Po alumni
French political scientists
French women journalists
20th-century French historians
French women historians
21st-century French historians
Hoover Institution people
Recipients of the Legion of Honour
20th-century French women writers
Women political scientists